Edward Clark Lilley (1896 – 1974)  was a director of musicals, operettas, and films in the United States. He worked for Universal Pictures.

Broadway
Walk with Music (1940)
Panama Hattie (1940)
Virginia

Filmography
Moonlight in Vermont (1943)
Never a Dull Moment (1943)
Larceny with Music (1943)
Honeymoon Lodge (1943)
Sing a Jingle (1943)
Hi, Good Lookin'! (1944)
My Gal Loves Music (1944), director and producer{
Allergic to Love (1944)
Babes on Swing Street (1944)
Swing Out, Sister (1945)

References

External links
IBDB page
IMDb page

1896 births
1974 deaths
American theatre directors